Pristin (stylized as PRISTIN and formerly known as Pledis Girlz) was a South Korean girl group formed by Pledis Entertainment in 2016. The group was composed of ten members: Nayoung, Roa, Yuha, Eunwoo, Rena, Kyulkyung, Yehana, Sungyeon, Xiyeon and Kyla. Most of them appeared on the television show Produce 101 and, as the prize for becoming two of the top contestants, Nayoung and Kyulkyung went on to debut as part of the project girl group I.O.I, before reuniting with the other members to debut as Pristin on March 21, 2017, with the first EP Hi! Pristin. Pristin was known for writing and composing their own music. Following two years without group activities, the group disbanded on May 24, 2019 when only 3 of the 10 members renewed their contract with Pledis Entertainment.

History

Pre-debut
The members Nayoung, Roa, Yuha, Eunwoo, Rena, Kyulkyung and Xiyeon competed together on Mnet's survival television show Produce 101, which aired from January 22 to April 1, 2016. While five of the members were eliminated, Nayoung and Kyulkyung became part of the final line-up for the project girl group I.O.I, which made its debut on May 4 with the single "Dream Girls".

Pledis Girlz
The group was officially announced as Pledis Girlz by Pledis Entertainment on March 23, 2016. On the same day, Eunwoo was featured on the song "Sickness" by Seventeen's Vernon as part of the soundtrack for the webtoon Love Revolution. Pledis Girlz held concerts from May 14 to September 10, 2016, in which the members performed weekly, with the exception of Nayoung and Kyulkyung, who were promoting with I.O.I at the time.

On June 27, they released the promotional single "We", which was written by Roa, Eunwoo, Sungyeon and Xiyeon. The music video for the song was used to introduce the members' profiles.

They held their last concert as Pledis Girlz, entitled Bye & Hi, on January 6, 2017, and then renamed to Pristin, a portmanteau of the words "prismatic" (bright and clear) and "elastin" (flawless strength).

2017–2018: Debut, moderate success and Pristin V
On March 2, 2017, Pledis Entertainment announced the group's debut through a teaser image. On March 21, Pristin debuted and released their first mini album Hi! Pristin, accompanied by the title track "Wee Woo". They became the first rookie girl group to perform their debut song on a live broadcast during Mnet Present. Pristin was also part of the line-up for the KCON festival held in Japan on May 19. On the same day, a remixed version of "Black Widow" was released as the album's second and final single, which was performed on a few music shows in order to conclude Hi Pristin's promotions.

On June 3, they performed at the 2017 Dream Concert at the Seoul World Cup Stadium. Their second mini album Schxxl Out was released on August 23, along with the single "We Like".

On October 12, it was announced that Kyla would take a break from the group's activities due to health issues. She returned temporarily to the United States to focus on her recovery.

On May 8, 2018, it was announced that Pristin would be debuting a sub-unit called Pristin V, consisting of members Nayoung, Roa, Eunwoo, Rena and Kyulkyung. Pristin V made their debut on May 28, 2018 with single album Like A V.

2019: Disbandment

On May 24, 2019, Pristin was officially disbanded. Pledis Entertainment announced that while Kyulkyung, Yehana, and Sungyeon would stay with the company, the remaining seven (Xiyeon, Rena, Roa, Kyla, Nayoung, Yuha, and Eunwoo) would be departing.

Members
 Nayoung — leader
 Roa
 Yuha
 Eunwoo
 Rena
 Kyulkyung
 Yehana
 Sungyeon
 Xiyeon
 Kyla

Sub-units
  Pristin V – Nayoung, Roa, Eunwoo, Rena, Kyulkyung

Discography

Extended plays

Singles

Promotional singles

Filmography

Music videos

Concerts

Pledis Girlz Concert (2016)

Awards and nominations

Notes

References

External links

  

 
Pledis Entertainment artists
K-pop music groups
Musical groups established in 2016
Musical groups disestablished in 2019
South Korean girl groups
South Korean pop music groups
South Korean dance music groups
Musical groups from Seoul
2016 establishments in South Korea
2019 disestablishments in South Korea